Ghosts of War may refer to:

 Ghosts of War (2010 film), a 2010 short film
 Ghosts of War (2020 film), a 2020 supernatural horror film
 Ghosts of War, alternative DVD title for the 2004 South Korean film R-Point
 Ghosts of War, song by Slayer from the 1988 album South of Heaven